John Payne is an English-Canadian voice actor who was originally in the UK and now works with Ocean Studios in Vancouver, British Columbia. He has played several roles in anime, most notably Ramba Ral in Mobile Suit Gundam and Rasetsu in Inuyasha.

Voice roles
3-2-1 Penguins! as Captain Zidgel (season two)
Adieu Galaxy Express 999 as Meowdar, Tochiro
Alienators: Evolution Continues as Additional Voices
Barbie and the Rockers: Out of this World
Brain Powered as Scientist
Christopher the Christmas Tree
Dreamkix as Roy's father
Exosquad as Alec DeLeon, Sean Napier
Fat Dog Mendoza as Avimimus, Buck Milligan
Fatal Fury: The Motion Picture as Jamin
Fantastic Four: World's Greatest Heroes as Henry Pym
G.I. Joe: Spy Troops as Duke
G.I. Joe: Valor vs. Venom as Duke
Galaxy Express 999 Movie as Tochiro
Green Legend Ran
He-Man and the Masters of the Universe as Sy-Klone, Moss-Man
Hot Wheels AcceleRacers – Breaking Point as Major Wheeler
Hot Wheels AcceleRacers – The Ultimate Race as Major Wheeler
Hot Wheels Highway 35 World Race as Major Wheeler
Human Crossing as Moriyama, Police Officer
Inuyasha as Rasetsu
Kessen as Kojuro Katakura, Retainer West
Maison Ikkoku  as Shun Mitaka
Mary-Kate and Ashley in Action! as Additional Voices
Master Keaton as Captain West (ep 27)
Mobile Suit Gundam as Ramba Ral
Mobile Suit Gundam Seed as Al-Jairi
Mobile Suit Gundam 00 as Commander Kim
Rainbow Fish as Sol
Ranma ½: Big Trouble in Nekonron, China as Prince Kirin
RoboCop: Alpha Commando as Additional Voices
Roswell Conspiracies: Aliens, Myths and Legends as Additional Voices
MegaMan NT Warrior as MetalMan
Santamouse and the Ratdeer as Honest Wease
Shadow Raiders as Sternum
Sherlock Holmes in the 22nd Century as Dr. John Watson
Spider-Man Unlimited as John Jameson
Saber Marionette R as Sanchest (Act 1)
Street Fighter as Escher
The Baby Huey Show as Additional Voices
The Cramp Twins as Agent X, Agent #2, Construction Worker
The Story of Saiunkoku as Sojun Sa, Man B, and Sa Family Member 1
What About Mimi? as Additional Voices
Yvon of the Yukon as Maurice, Seedy Local

Live-action roles
The Commish as Marc Murray
Da Vinci's Inquest as Park Maintenance
MacGyver as Dave Edwards
Super Dave's All Stars as Harry the SFX Guy
Viper as Buddy Winters
The X-Files as Guard and Jerald Glazebrook

References

External links

Living people
Canadian male film actors
Canadian male television actors
Canadian male voice actors
English expatriates in Canada
English male film actors
English male television actors
English male voice actors
Place of birth missing (living people)
Year of birth missing (living people)
20th-century English male actors
21st-century English male actors
20th-century Canadian male actors
21st-century Canadian male actors